Per Bengt Magnus Ingemar Rösiö (14 May 1927 – 19 May 2019) was a Swedish diplomat and author. He served as Ambassador to 17 countries and authored 20 books, mainly on diplomacy. He is more widely known however for having conducted the Swedish government's inquiry into the death of the UN Secretary General Dag Hammarskjöld where he maintained that there was no foul play.

Early life
Rösiö was born  on 14 May 1927 in Åmål, Sweden, the son of Birger Rösiö, a district veterinarian, and his wife Jonita (née Hedin). He received a Candidate of Law degree from Uppsala University in 1949 and carried out university studies in Dublin, Vienna, The Hague and Paris from 1947 to 1950 before becoming an attaché at the Ministry for Foreign Affairs in 1951.

Career
Rösiö served at the legation in New Delhi in 1953, at the Consulate General in Bombay in 1954 where he was Trade Commissioner from 1955 to 1958 and where he became vice consul in 1957. He was embassy secretary in Beijing from 1958 to 1959 and secretary at the Swedish Foreign Ministry from 1959 to 1961. There Rösiö was secretary of the administration investigation for aid to developing countries in 1960.

He was then first vice consul in Léopoldville from 1961 to 1962. Rösiö was administrative director of the Dag Hammarskjöld Foundation from 1962 to 1964, first embassy secretary in Washington, D.C. from 1964 to 1965, United Nations Deputy Resident Representative in Algiers in 1965 and embassy counsellor in Khartoum from 1966 to 1969. He was consul general in Houston from 1969 to 1971 and deputy director at the Foreign Ministry from 1972 to 1973. Rösiö was ambassador in Jeddah from 1974 to 1977, ambassador in Islamabad from 1977 to 1979, ambassador in Prague from 1979 to 1981 and ambassador in Kuala Lumpur (also accredited to Rangoon) from 1981 to 1985. He was then consul general in Montreal from 1985 to 1990 when he was appointed regional ambassador for French-speaking Central Africa at the Swedish Foreign Ministry. He left the post in 1992.

In 1991, following reports in the British press about a Belgian mercenary who claimed he shot down Dag Hammarskjöld's plane on 18 September 1961 (while Rösiö served as consul in Léopoldville), the Swedish government decided to launch a one-man inquiry which was conducted by Rösiö. He pointed out a number of questions in previous reports, but came to the conclusion that the cause of the crash was indisputably pilot error. Claims of the fuselage being riddled with bullet holes were false, a fact to which he could attest since he was one of the first people to inspect the wreckage. He also proved that accounts by mercenaries contained glaring inconsistencies (the fuel tanks of their planes were far too small to cover the distances they claimed). Since the report was submitted in 1993 it has served as Sweden's official stance on what happened in Ndola.

On some of his ambassador posts, he had a large number of side accreditations and was thus one of the few Swedish diplomats who served in more than 25 countries. Overall, he visited more than 140 countries during his life. Rösiö also penned more than 500 articles after his retirement from the Foreign Service, many of which were later published in anthologies. He was a restless observer of events, both at home and abroad, and perhaps most remembered by his books is Yrke: diplomat (1988) [Occupation: diplomat] which gives a full introduction to what the diplomatic profession entails.

Personal life
In 1955 he married Joan Binns (born 1930). They divorced and in 1969 Rösiö married Görel Pernvik, daughter of the managing director Allan Pernvik and Barbro (née Hermansson). He had two children; Josefine Hjelm and Adrian Rösiö.

Bibliography

References

External links

1927 births
2019 deaths
Swedish male writers
Consuls-general of Sweden
Ambassadors of Sweden to Saudi Arabia
Ambassadors of Sweden to Oman
Ambassadors of Sweden to Bahrain
Ambassadors of Sweden to the United Arab Emirates
Ambassadors of Sweden to Pakistan
Ambassadors of Sweden to Czechoslovakia
Ambassadors of Sweden to Malaysia
Ambassadors of Sweden to the Democratic Republic of the Congo
Ambassadors of Sweden to the Central African Republic
Ambassadors of Sweden to Gabon
Ambassadors of Sweden to Cameroon
Ambassadors of Sweden to Equatorial Guinea
Ambassadors of Sweden to Chad
People from Åmål Municipality
Uppsala University alumni